"The Three Legged Stool of the Republican Party" also known by "The Gipper's Stool" or "Reagan's Stool" is a theory about the composition of the Republican party.

It is intended to explain the way the Republican Party's power base derives from the three main "legs" (factions) within the "stool", those being the Christian right/social conservatives, fiscal conservatives, and foreign interventionists. This coalition came together with the rise of the New Right and the election of Ronald Reagan.

Terminology 
Variants of the phrase often are used interchangeability such as "Gipper's Stool" or "Reagan's Stool".

Ronald Reagan coined the term as a way to describe the republican party as a three part coalition based on the social conservatives (consisting of the Christian right and paleo-conservatives), war hawks (consisting of interventionists and neoconservatives), and fiscal conservatives (consisting of right-libertarians and free-market capitalists), with overlap between the sides.

The phrase "Legs" describe each member of the coalition and the idea is without a leg the party cannot win (as a stool cannot support itself with two legs).

History 

During the election of 1980 Ronald Reagan described the party as a three-legged stool, most combining their different brands of conservatism in opposition to the Soviet Union and the spread of Communism during the Cold War This political philosophy is often branded as Fusionism as both groups have overlapping interests as Libertarian philosopher Frank Meyer as both shared values and most importantly enemies. 

During the 2007 Iowa caucuses Mitt Romney carried a physical three-legged stool, explaining the importance of each leg. He also stated in terms of the importance of the legs as being “our candidate has to be somebody who can represent and speak for all three legs of the conservative stool or conservative coalition that Ronald Reagan put together — social conservatives, economic conservatives, and defense conservatives.”, and without it the party would fail.

Criticism 
Critics often use the stool as a means to criticize party leadership or another member of the stool, such is in the lament of the "death of the stool" with the election of Donald Trump.

Pundits often criticize party membership for abandoning the stool as Business Insider reported "the person said that thanks mostly to President George W. Bush, the party has failed on the first two legs. The country has shifted significantly on the last one, and there's nothing a Republican candidate can do to change it." Senator Spencer Abraham has also criticized the stool saying "The Republican party has much greater divides now in terms of the feelings of its voters than it did when Reagan ran."

References 

Ronald Reagan
Political theories
Conservatism in the United States